Parvibaculum indicum is a Gram-negative, rod-shaped and motile bacterium with a polar flagellum species from the genus of Parvibaculum which has been isolated from deep-sea water from the Indian Ocean.

References

Further reading

External links 
Type strain of Parvibaculum indicum at BacDive -  the Bacterial Diversity Metadatabase

Bacteria described in 2011